Hellion(s) may refer to:

Books
Hellion (Marvel Comics), a comic book character from X-Men
Hellions (Marvel Comics), several groups of fictional hellions in Marvel Comics

Film and TV
The Hellion (1924 film), an American Western film 
The Hellion (1919 film), a silent film drama
The Hellions, a 1961 British adventure film set in South Africa
Hellion (film), a 2014 film
Hellions (film), a 2015 film

Music
Hellion (band), an American heavy metal band
Hellions (band), an Australian post-hardcore band
"The Hellion", a song by Heavy Metal band Judas Priest
"The Hellion", a song by American rock/metal band W.A.S.P.

Sports
Hellions of Troy, an American roller derby league
Hartford Hellions, an American soccer team

Games
Hellion (video game), a video game by Zero Gravity

See also
Hell:on, a Ukrainian thrash/death metal band
Upton Hellions, an English village